The Ebbatop is the best-known mountain of the Van Asch Van Wijck Mountains situated in the Suriname Sipaliwini district. The Van Asch van Wijck mountain range consists of a series of free-standing mountains dotted throughout a terrain. The highest peaks are roughly 500 to 700 meters high, Ebbatop being the most northern at 721 meters high.

References

Inselbergs of South America
Mountains of Suriname
Sipaliwini District